Leon Ware (February 16, 1940 – February 23, 2017) was an American songwriter, producer, composer, and singer. Besides a solo career as a performer, Ware was best known for producing hits for other artists including Michael Jackson, Quincy Jones, Maxwell, Minnie Riperton and Marvin Gaye, co-producing the latter's album, I Want You.

Early life 
Ware was born and raised in Detroit, Michigan, United States. His mother was a minister and a pianist for their local Baptist church and his father worked for Ford Motor Co. on the assembly line. Ware was the youngest of ten siblings. He was blind for two years after he had an accident with a slingshot when he was five years old. Despite being only blind in the right eye, his left eye was covered as well. Ware said that, "They [presumably his family] worried that if my left eye wasn’t covered, it would be too strong if my right eye regained its vision." Subsequently, he was sent to the Michigan School for the Blind. In his teens, he was a member of a vocal group, the Romeos, with Lamont Dozier and Ty Hunter (later of the Originals).

Career

Early career 
Ware worked at ABC Records as an arranger and songwriter before he joined Motown as a songwriter in 1967. He had co-written songs for the Isley Brothers, Martha & the Vandellas, and the Jackson 5 during his early years at Motown.

Early major songwriting success: 1971–1973 
In 1971, Ware collaborated with Ike & Tina Turner, co-writing six songs on their United Artists album, [['Nuff Said (Ike & Tina Turner album)|Nuff Said.]] The album reached the #21 on the Billboard R&B chart and also appeared on the Billboard 200. This led to a contract as a solo artist on United Artists where he released his self-titled debut album in 1972. Around this time, Ware began collaborating with Arthur "T-Boy" Ross, younger brother of Diana Ross. One of the songs they wrote together was "I Wanna Be Where You Are," recorded by Michael Jackson for his 1972 album, Got To Be There. The single reached number-two on the R&B charts and peaked at #16 on the Billboard Hot 100 in 1972. Ware wrote for numerous artists during this period including Donny Hathaway and The Miracles.

 Subsequent success: 1974–1976 
In 1974, Quincy Jones booked Ware as songwriter and performer for two songs on Jones' Body Heat album. The song "If I Ever Lose This Heaven" hit the R&B charts in September of that year and was covered by the Average White Band. Ware had worked with Minnie Riperton on Jones' album, and they collaborated again on Riperton's album, Adventures in Paradise, composing Riperton's R&B hit, "Inside My Love," and the two collaborated yet again on Ware's second album, Musical Massage. Ware and Ross worked on demos for Ware's second album, this one to be issued on Motown and also for Ross to win a deal. One of the demo recordings, "I Want You," was heard by Berry Gordy, who decided the song would be a good fit for Marvin Gaye. Gaye heard the other demos and decided to record much of it on what would be his next album, I Want You. Buoyed by the number-one title track, the album peaked at number-one on the R&B charts and it reached the Top Ten of the Billboard 200 and sold over a million copies.

 Recording, songwriting, producing, and later career: 1976–2010s 
Having given away the material for his album, Ware began again on a solo effort for Motown's Gordy label. The result would become his second album, Musical Massage, released in September 1976. The album was a commercial failure due to poor promotion. However, it became a cult hit among soul music fans that were intrigued by Gaye's I Want You album and the songs from Ware himself. After his brief stint as a recording artist at Motown, Ware decided to focus on writing and producing for other artists, and he wouldn't release another album until 1979. He finally achieved chart success when he released his third album, Inside Is Love, via Fabulous Records in 1979. It reached the charts along with its single, "What's Your Name," establishing him as a recording artist for the first time. After recording for Fabulous Records, Ware signed with Elektra Records, and he released his fourth album in 1981, titled Rockin' You Eternally, which spawned two R&B singles chart entries, "Baby Don't Stop Me" and the title song, but the album itself did not reach the charts. Elektra financed a follow-up, and Ware's fifth album, Leon Ware, was released in 1982.Leon Ware (1982). Leon Ware. Elektra Records. Retrieved 2023-01-15. Unfortunately for Ware, the label dropped him when the album failed to sell many copies. In 1987, he signed with Slingshot Records and released his sixth album, Undercover.

Some of the artists that Ware had written and produced for in between and after those periods include Shadow, Teena Marie, Jeffrey Osborne, Loose Ends, James Ingram, Melissa Manchester, Krystol, Bobby Womack, and Lulu, co-writing the latter's European hit, "Independence."

In the '90s, his earlier work became a heavy source of samples in hip-hop music. William Ruhlmann of AllMusic wrote, "Such success didn't increase Ware's exposure as an artist, but it substantially increased his publishing income. At the same time, he was being discovered as a soul music progenitor, particularly in England, where the Expansion label began reissuing his solo albums." Ware then released his seventh album, Taste the Love, on his own Kitchen Records label in 1995 to help his cause. He also contributed to singer Maxwell's 1996 debut album Maxwell's Urban Hang Suite by co-writing "Sumthin' Sumthin'." The album is considered one of the landmark albums of the neo-soul genre.

Throughout the 2000s, Ware continued to release several albums, which are Candlelight (2001), Love's Drippin (2003), Deeper (2004), A Kiss in the Sand (2004), and Moon Ride (2008).

In the 2010s, Ware was featured in several projects by current artists, such as Cherry Bomb by Tyler, the Creator, Vibes by Theophilus London, and Love in Beats by Omar. In 2019, after two years of his death, a posthumous album, Rainbow Deux, was released.

Personal life 
Ware was married four times. His second wife was Susaye Greene, whom he married in 1974 and would later divorce in the same year. He was married to Carol Ware until his death.

Illness and death 
As of 2009, Ware was recovering from treatment for prostate cancer, and credited his friend and fellow songwriter Adrienne Anderson with directing him to appropriate medical care. He died in Marina del Rey, California, on February 23, 2017, from complications of prostate cancer. He was 77. At the time of his death, he was survived by his wife, his sons, his granddaughter, and his brothers.

Discography

Studio albums

Charted singles

Songwriting credits 
Ware wrote and co-wrote dozens of songs for various artists, some of his credits include:

 1966: "Tell Me I'll Never Be Alone" – Martha & The Vandellas
 1967: Souled Out – The Righteous Brothers
 1967: "Land of Tomorrow" – Kim Weston
 1967: "Got To Have You Back" – The Isley Brothers
 1971: 'Nuff Said – Ike & Tina Turner
 1972: "I Wanna Be Where You Are" – Michael Jackson
 1972: "Up In Heah" – Ike & Tina Turner
 1972: "I Know How It Feels To Be Lonely" – Delaney & Bonnie
 1972: "Don't Tell Me I'm Crazy" – Edwin Starr 
 1973: "Give Me Just Another Day" – The Miracles
 1973: "Stay Away" – Valentinos
 1973: "Able, Qualified, And Ready" – Bonnie Bramlett
 1973: "Rolling Down A Mountainside" – Isaac Hayes
 1973: "Euphoria" – Michael Jackson
 1973: "It's Too Late To Change The Time" – The Jackson 5
 1973: "Don't Say Goodbye Again" – The Jackson 5
 1973: "I Know It's You" – Donny Hathaway
 1974: "If I Ever Lose This Heaven" – Quincy Jones
 1975: Adventures In Paradise – Minnie Riperton
 1975: "If I Ever Lose This Heaven" – Nancy Wilson
 1975: "If I Don't Love You This Way" – The Temptations
 1975: "Git It" – Bobby Womack
 1976: I Want You – Marvin Gaye
 1977: "Fantasy Is Reality" – Parliament
 1980: "Everywhere Inside Of Me" – Norman Connors
 1980: "No Tricks" – Chuck Jackson
 1984: "Show Me Your Magic" – Bobby King
 1984: "My Dear Mr. Gaye" – Teena Marie
 1986: "Love's Been Here And Gone" – James Ingram
 1986: "You Make Me Want To (Love Again)" – Vesta Williams
 1996: "Sumthin' Sumthin'" – Maxwell

References

External links
 At Allmusic
 
Artist page at Soul Walking
 
Leon Ware 75 minute audio mix with dialogue
Leon Ware 2012 Interview at Soulinterviews.com

Video
Leon Ware RBMA video lecture session

1940 births
2017 deaths
Musicians from Detroit
American soul musicians
Record producers from Michigan
Deaths from prostate cancer
Deaths from cancer in California
African-American male singer-songwriters
United Artists Records artists
Elektra Records artists
P-Vine Records artists
Motown artists
Stax Records artists
20th-century African-American male singers
21st-century African-American male singers
Singer-songwriters from Michigan